Byron Paine (October 10, 1827January 13, 1871) was an American lawyer and justice of the Wisconsin Supreme Court.  His successful representation of Ezekiel Gillespie in the 1866 case of Gillespie v. Palmer resulted in the legal recognition of voting rights for African Americans in Wisconsin.

Early life and career
Paine was born in Painesville, Ohio, to General James H. Paine and Marilla Paine. He moved to Milwaukee in 1847 with his father and studied law.  He was admitted to the bar in 1849, and entered a legal partnership, Jas. H. Paine & Sons, with his father and his brother, Hortensius.

As a young lawyer, he was a close friend of the abolitionist Sherman Booth.  And in 1854, when Booth was on trial for violating the Fugitive Slave Act, Paine represented him as his lawyer without compensation.  Paine argued on his behalf in front of the Wisconsin Supreme Court, in the case of Ableman v. Booth.

At Paine's funeral, Justice Harlow S. Orton remarked that he had, "made one of the clearest, most conclusive and most eloquent arguments against the constitutionality of the fugitive slave law made in any court in the country."  Paine won the case and became the only lawyer to successfully argue that fugitive slave laws violated the sovereignty of the northern states.  Although the United States Supreme Court did eventually overrule the Wisconsin decision.

Wisconsin Supreme Court Chief Justice Edward George Ryan, who had opposed Paine in the Booth case as attorney for the United States, said of him, "The first opportunity I had of forming an estimate of his high ability, was in the famous case under the fugitive slave act, in 1854 and 1855. He was employed for the defendant; I, for the United States. We both brought to the case, not only ordinary professional zeal, but all the prejudices of all our lives. He was a frank and manly abolitionist. I was as decidedly what was called pro-slavery. We were both thoroughly in earnest...I thought him a fanatic. He probably thought me one. Possibly we both were."

In the 1856 session of the Wisconsin State Senate, Paine served as Chief Clerk.  In 1857 he was elected Judge in Milwaukee County, where he served until his election to the Wisconsin Supreme Court in 1859.

Civil War Service

Paine's term on the Supreme Court was set to expire in 1865, but in the midst of the American Civil War, in 1864, Paine chose to resign from the Court and enlist with the Union Army. He was commissioned as lieutenant colonel for the newly raised 43rd Wisconsin Infantry Regiment, serving under Colonel Amasa Cobb. The regiment was assigned to Tennessee to defend railroad and supply lines, and saw some combat during the Franklin–Nashville Campaign near the end of the war.

Later years and 2nd Supreme Court term

After the Civil War, Paine returned to Milwaukee and resumed practicing law.  During this period, he participated in another significant civil rights case, when he represented Ezekiel Gillespie in the 1866 case of Gillespie v. Palmer.  Gillespie was a former slave who attempted to vote in Milwaukee in 1865, but was turned away.  Paine argued that Wisconsin had granted voting rights to African Americans through an 1849 law and referendum, which had been ignored for the previous 17 years.  The Wisconsin Supreme Court ruled in Gillespie's favor, ruling that African Americans had the right to vote in Wisconsin.

In 1867, Jason Downer, who had succeeded Paine on the Wisconsin Supreme Court, resigned. Wisconsin Governor Lucius Fairchild appointed Paine to fill the vacancy. Paine served on the Supreme Court until his death in January 1871.

Family and personal life

Paine married Clarissa Wyman. They had five sons, though only three survived infancy. He was an avid reader and enjoyed studying theology.

Paine died on January 13, 1871, in Monona, Wisconsin.

Electoral history

Wisconsin Supreme Court (1859)

| colspan="6" style="text-align:center;background-color: #e9e9e9;"| General Election, April 5, 1859

Wisconsin Supreme Court (1868)

| colspan="6" style="text-align:center;background-color: #e9e9e9;"| General Election, April 7, 1868

References

External links

People from Painesville, Ohio
Politicians from Milwaukee
People from Monona, Wisconsin
Justices of the Wisconsin Supreme Court
People of Wisconsin in the American Civil War
Union Army officers
1827 births
1871 deaths
Lawyers from Milwaukee
American abolitionists
Wisconsin lawyers
19th-century American judges
19th-century American lawyers